Patrīcija Eiduka (born 1 February 2000) is a cross-country skier from Latvia. She started skiing at age three in Vecbebri. Eiduka competed for Latvia at the 2018 Winter Olympics. She competed at the 2022 Winter Olympics, in Women's 10 kilometre classical, Women's 30 kilometre freestyle, Women's 15 kilometre skiathlon, Women's sprint, and Women's 4 × 5 kilometre relay.

Cross-country skiing results
All results are sourced from the International Ski Federation (FIS).

Olympic Games

World Championships

World Cup

Season standings

Personal life
Her brother is fellow cross-country skier Valts Eiduks who represented Latvia during the 2006 Winter Olympics. Her father Ingus Eiduks, who died on 2 November 2021 due to COVID-19 complications, had been her long time coach.

References 

2000 births
Living people
Cross-country skiers at the 2018 Winter Olympics
Cross-country skiers at the 2022 Winter Olympics
Latvian female cross-country skiers
Olympic cross-country skiers of Latvia
Cross-country skiers at the 2016 Winter Youth Olympics
21st-century Latvian women